Dioptis fratelloi is a moth of the family Notodontidae first described by James S. Miller in 2008. It is only known from Mount Wokomung and the north slope of Mount Roraima in western Guyana.

The length of the forewings is 19–19.5 mm for males and 21 mm for females. The ground color of the forewings is hyaline (glass like), with blackish-brown veins as they pass through hyaline areas. The hindwings are hyaline, also with blackish brown veins in the hyaline area.

Etymology
The species is named in honor of Steve Fratello.

References

Moths described in 2008
Notodontidae of South America